The 2016–17 Liga I was the fourth season, since its reintroduction in 2013, of the second level women's football league of the Romanian football league system. As a third tier league was created this season, the number of teams was limited to 16. As such, 16 teams divided in 2 series played in the competition that consisted of a double round-robin lasting 14 stages, totaling 112 matches.

Team changes

To Liga I
New founded teams
 Vasas Femina Odorhei 2

From Liga I
Promoted to the 2016–17 Superliga
 CSȘ Târgoviște (winners of the 2015–16 Liga I, Seria I)
 CFR Timișoara (winners of the 2015–16 Liga I, Seria II)

Disbanded
 FC Hunedoara (withdrawn after the 2015–16 Liga I)
 Viitorul 2010 Buzău (withdrawn after the 2015–16 Liga I)
 Oțelul Galați (withdrawn during the 2015–16 Liga I)
 Victoria Craiova (withdrawn during the 2015–16 Liga I)

Renamed teams
Nuova Mama Mia Becicherecu Mic changed its name to Fortuna Becicherecu Mic.

Teams

Seria I

Seria II

League tables and Results

Seria I League table

Seria II League table

References

External links
 Official site

Rom
Fem
Women's football in Romania